Plum Creek is a  long 2nd tributary to the Nanticoke River in Wicomico County, Maryland.

Variant names
According to the Geographic Names Information System, it has also been known historically as:
Plumb Creek

Course
Plum Creek rises in Columbia in Sussex County, Delaware and then flows northwest into Wicomico County, Maryland to join the Nanticoke River about 0.5 miles north of Riverton.

Watershed
Plum Creek drains  of area, receives about 44.3 in/year of precipitation, has a topographic wetness index of 627.39 and is about 13% forested.

See also
List of Delaware rivers
List of Maryland rivers

References

Rivers of Delaware
Rivers of Maryland
Rivers of Sussex County, Delaware
Rivers of Wicomico County, Maryland
Tributaries of the Nanticoke River